1850 Naval Air Squadron (1850 NAS) was a Naval Air Squadron of the Royal Navy's Fleet Air Arm.

References

Bibliography

External links
 

1800 series Fleet Air Arm squadrons
Air squadrons of the Royal Navy in World War II
Military units and formations established in 1944